The 2012 Alabama A&M Bulldogs football team represented Alabama Agricultural and Mechanical University (Alabama A&M) in the 2012 NCAA Division I FCS football season. The Bulldogs were led by 11th-year head coach Anthony Jones and played their home games at Louis Crews Stadium. They were a member of the East Division of the Southwestern Athletic Conference and finished the season with an overall record of seven wins and four losses (7–4, 6–3 SWAC).

Schedule

References

Alabama AandM
Alabama A&M Bulldogs football seasons
Alabama AandM Bulldogs football team